Matías Pellegrini (born 11 March 2000) is an Argentine professional footballer who plays as a left winger for Major League Soccer club New York City FC.

Club career

Estudiantes 
Pellegrini began with Estudiantes, who signed him from CRIM de Magdalena. He was moved into the senior squad under manager Leandro Benítez during 2018–19, who selected him for his professional debut in a Copa Argentina tie with Central Córdoba on 24 July 2018. After featuring in the 2018 Copa Libertadores versus Grêmio, Pellegrini made his first appearance in the Primera División on 12 August during a defeat to Godoy Cruz. In his next match a week later, also in the league, he scored the first senior goal in a 2–0 victory over Boca Juniors. Overall, Pellegrini ended his first campaign with four goals in twenty-three fixtures.

Inter Miami
On 23 July 2019, Pellegrini agreed a transfer to Major League Soccer's Inter Miami, and he was immediately loaned back to Estudiantes until January 2020. The transfer fee was reported to be "between $6 million and $9 million."

On 16 April 2021, Inter Miami removed Pellegrini from their roster to meet MLS requirements. He was loaned to Fort Lauderdale CF, Inter Miami's USL League One affiliate.

On 2 August 2021, Inter Miami loaned Pellegrini to his former club Estudiantes until June 2022 with an option to buy. Estudiantes did not exercise their purchase option at the end of the loan, however, and Inter Miami subsequently waived Pellegrini so that he could join another MLS club on a free outside of the transfer window.

New York City FC
On 19 August 2022, MLS club New York City FC claimed Pellegrini off waivers.

International career
Pellegrini was called up to train with the Argentina U17s in November 2016. Two years later, in 2018, he was selected by the U20s.

Career statistics

Honours
New York City FC
Campeones Cup: 2022

References

External links
 
 
 

2000 births
Living people
Sportspeople from Buenos Aires Province
Argentine people of Italian descent
Argentine footballers
Argentine expatriate footballers
Association football midfielders
Designated Players (MLS)
Estudiantes de La Plata footballers
Inter Miami CF players
Inter Miami CF II players
Argentine Primera División players
Major League Soccer players
Expatriate soccer players in the United States
Argentine expatriate sportspeople in the United States
New York City FC players